Asger agha Gorani or Asger bey Adigozalov (Azerbaijani: Əsgər ağa Gorani; b. 3 May 1857, Goran-Boyahmedli, Elizavetpol', Tiflis Governorate - d. 9 March 1910, Elizavetpol') was the first Azerbaijani writer, actor, theater critic, translator and journalist.

Life 
Asger agha Gorani was born on 3 May 1857 in the village of Goran-Boyahmedli. He was the grandson of the Azerbaijani historian, the author of the historical work "Karabakh-name" Mirza Adigozal bey. His family was originally from Shusha.  He graduated from the Baku City Gymnasium with a gold medal. Then he entered the Petrovsky Agricultural Academy in Moscow. After graduating from the academy in 1878, he returned to his homeland.

He was a provincial secretary, collegiate assessor, property adviser. He worked as an assistant judge of the county judge of the Elizavetpol (Ganja) province, assistant prosecutor in the prosecutor's office of the Tiflis district court, head of the Elizavetpol (Ganja) municipality for five years, honorary warden of the Mikhailovskaya school in c (Ganja). In Elizavetpol, at his own expense, he opened a school for girls.

He died in 1910 in Elizavetpol, was buried in the old city cemetery Sabiskar. Turbe was erected over his grave.

Creativity 
Asger agha Gorani was one of the first Azerbaijani theatrical actors. While still a schoolboy, he took part in amateur performances by M. F. Akhundov. In 1873, in the comedy "Adventures of the Lankaran Khanate Vizier" he played the role of Teymur aga, a little later he played the main role in the comedy "Haji Kara".

Asger agha was the author of theatrical and artistic works. In his comedy "Tricks in old age" (published in 1892 in Tiflis), feudal-patriarchal mores are criticized.  Adygezalov's novel "The Black Wind" is dedicated to the campaign of Agha Mohammed Shah Qajar to the Caucasus. He also wrote the play "Qocalıqda yorğalıq" and the vaudeville "Hənək, hənək, axırı dəyənək". He translated some poetic works of Pushkin and Lermontov into Azerbaijani.

See also 
 Hasan bey Zardabi

References

Footnotes

Sources 
 
 
 

People from Ganja, Azerbaijan
1857 births
1910 deaths
Azerbaijani publicists
Azerbaijani translators
Azerbaijani writers